Namdar Realty Group is an American shopping mall investment company based in Great Neck, New York. They primarily purchase shopping malls with partner Mason Asset Management. Namdar and Mason are both family owned, and as of 2021, own over 400 properties including 100 plus malls.

Strategy
Namdar and Mason primarily purchase malls for low prices, with various problems, but do not invest in improving them. The deals for these malls are done in cash. Most malls they purchase are in markets considered B and C grade. Because of this low price/maintenance, they have a high return on investment. Namdar's primary source of investment capital comes from bonds on the Tel Aviv Stock Exchange. 

Namdar and Mason often charge lower rent to keep mall vacancies low. They will also split proprieties to sell off individual pieces. The companies also work with Uber Capital Group LLC and Gorjian Acquisitions to acquire properties. CH Capital Group has become a partner in several acquisitions.

History
Namdar and Mason partnered to begin purchasing malls in 2012, with the first mall purchased being Desoto Square Mall. Phillipsburg Mall was purchased from PREIT in 2013 for $11.5 million, with numerous subdivisions and sales later occurring including the anchor building housing Kohl's. The roof at the former Sears at the Phillipsburg Mall would later collapse. Lawsuits were ongoing in 2018 over Regency Square Mall's lack of maintenance by Namdar. Voorhees Town Center was having maintenance and security issues the same year. Jennifer Furniture was purchased in June 2020 by John Garg and Namdar. Namdar and Mason purchased most of the bankrupt Goodrich Quality Theaters chain in July 2020. Namdar was a partner in several New York City area property purchases in 2021.

Failed Bon-Ton purchase 

Namdar was part of a group of investors who attempted to purchase The Bon-Ton from liquidation. The group also included DW Partners LP and Washington Prime Group. Due to a fee issue, the attempt failed, and Bon-Ton liquidated.

List of properties
Mall properties owned or managed by Namdar Realty Group as of 2021 include: (This list is incomplete)

References

External links
Namdar Realty Group website
Mason Asset Management website
CH Capital Group website

 
Companies based in Nassau County, New York
Shopping center management firms